is a fictional character and primary overarching antagonist of Spike Chunsoft's Danganronpa series.

The character has also appeared in manga and musical adaptations of the series, in Danganronpa V3: Killing Harmony in a cameo appearance, and in the light novel series Danganronpa Zero, in which she is depicted as the true identity of its amnesiac protagonist, .

Conception and creation

Originally conceived as an early murder victim, the idea of Junko as an antagonist in Danganronpa: Trigger Happy Havoc was conceived of by series' creator and scenario writer Kazutaka Kodaka as a "fully unsympathetic" villain with no tragic backstory to explain her actions, due to his personal dislike for the popular sympathetic villain trope. Kodaka later elaborated that Junko appears to have toxic love towards her classmates due to how rather than killing them, she forces into scenarios where they would choose to kill each other as she believes that despair is the ultimate salvation for people, while exposing the hypocrisy of those who believe themselves above it.

"I wanted to create a character who is bad because she is evil, who only desires outright desperation. With no possibility of redemption, [and that] the idea that absolute evil is something desirable and pleasant. As bad as she is, she is so powerful and charming that she draws you in. So one way I thought of showing that was to make a very cute character that was visually appealing to look at." — Kazutaka Kodaka

Kodaka later confirmed Junko's motives to be rooted in her obsession for the entirety of her 77th (and 78th class), seeking to induce more despair on someone the more they meant to them. Early concept art for the character depicts her with smaller pigtails, a white skirt, and an overall golden color scheme with red and black highlights, elements of which were also adopted for the character's fraternal twin sister Mukuro Ikusaba. The character's resurrection in Goodbye Despair was left to the player's interpretation. Kodaka compared the theory of whether or not she is dead or alive to Western villains like the Joker from Batman who continuously are brought back to life. However, Kodaka claims Junko can be killed. In retrospective, he feels like Junko could be his strongest villain ever created.  Due to how powerless Junko is in comparison to Izuru, the scenes involving how the former manipulates the latter were written to show Junko at her lowest since she could not defeat Izuru in combat, so the writers focused on psychology involving their passions.

In Danganronpa/Zero, the given name of her amnesiac alias  means “Refreshing child”, while her surname  means “no sound”, a play-on-words of "demure" .

Characteristics and backstory
At the time of Danganronpa: Trigger Happy Havoc, Junko has Mukuro pose as her so that she may die in her place in a moment of "Ultimate Despair", while she uses her Monokuma persona to embark on her killing game. Upon being exposed as the mastermind, Junko embodies a series of personas revealed in Danganronpa 2: Goodbye Despair to be based on the personalities of her cult of followers, the "Ultimate Despair." Junko additionally manages to cheat her own self-imposed execution by having her mind converted to an artificial intelligence at the moment of her original death.

Appearances

Danganronpa video games
In the first game, Danganronpa: Trigger Happy Havoc, Junko fakes her death by having Mukuro pose as her so she can kill her under her Monokuma guise, using the event to encourage her former classmates at Hope's Peak Academy to participate in a "killing game", both actions serving to feed her desire to fuel an "ultimate despair" within herself and them. Throughout the game, Junko (in the form of a robotic stuffed bear dubbed Monokuma) provides various motives to turn the students against one another, overseeing the subsequent class trials and performing the various executions while broadcasting the events to the world at large, culminating in her presenting Mukuro's corpse in an attempt to frame the "Ultimate Detective" Kyoko Kirigiri without breaking the rules she set for herself for the "killing game", and ultimately agreeing to execute herself after being exposed as the mastermind.

In Danganronpa 2: Goodbye Despair, Junko is revealed to have used Chihiro's Alter Ego technology to transfer her consciousness into Monokuma at the moment of her death as an A.I. (explaining their reactivation in the prior game's post-credits scene), hijacking the Future Foundation's attempted removal of her followers' brainwashing by having her top lieutenant and former "Ultimate Hope" Izuru Kamukura download her into their rehabilitation program "Neo World", where she places their younger virtual selves into another "killing game". In the game's climax, Junko's true plan is revealed to be to transfer her A.I self into the bodies of those of her followers whose virtual selves killed each other, their real selves (with whom she shared a polyamorous relationship) having arranged their capture to allow Junko a chance to return in a physical body, and from there to the watching Future Foundation and the wider world at large, to be dubbed "Junkoland". Ultimately, after her followers' virtual selves decide to remain in the program, Alter Ego Junko is deleted by a new manifestation of the program's former operator, Usami.

In the climax of Danganronpa Another Episode: Ultra Despair Girls, set between the first and second games, the Monokuma variants Shirokuma and Kurokuma are both revealed to be under the control of Alter Ego Junko, with the goal of molding Monaca Towa to become the "heir to despair", before they are both destroyed by Izuru Kamukura so he can transfer her to a USB to bring with him to Jabberwock Island, setting up the events of Danganronpa 2: Goodbye Despair.

Junko appears in a cameo appearance in the third main series installment, Danganronpa V3: Killing Harmony, in the bonus minigame "Ultimate Talent Development Plan", with the game's new ultimate mastermind behind Monokuma being a copycat cosplay fan of Junko who seeks to continue her legacy, with the return of the true Junko being teased multiple times throughout the game.

Danganronpa anime
In the "Despair Arc" of Danganronpa 3: The End of Hope's Peak High School, set before the events of the first game, Junko is collected from the airport by Mukuro in a limo after she blows up her taxi. While alluding to their murderous relationship, the pair attempt to see if they can kill one another and experience the "Ultimate Despair", before Junko explains that the pair have been scouted to attend Hope's Peak Academy, Mukuro as the "Ultimate Soldier", and Junko as both the "Ultimate Fashionista" and "Ultimate Analyst". At their entrance ceremony, Junko sketches a picture of Monokuma. Two years later, Junko and Mukuro slaughter their way to confront and destroy Hope's Peak Academy's "Ultimate Hope" Izuru Kamukura, intending to kill him, only for the pair to be easily defeated. After sharing their love for despair with him and pitching that they join their cause, Izuru deduces the "Despair Sisters" are too bored with the world and share similar analytical abilities to himself, agreeing to join their cause, before knocking the pair out so that he may escape. Later, Junko and Mukuro recruit the "Ultimate Animator" Ryota Mitarai, whom they share as a lover, to develop a brainwashing anime to serve their cause, which they test on the "Ultimate Nurse" Mikan Tsumiki, who pledges herself to the sisters in the name of despair. Contacting Izuru once again, Junko and Mukuro arrange for their first "killing game" with the Academy's student council, trapping them on a floor of the school and providing blackmail on their elite parents' various scandals, with Izuru partaking in the event and killing the final survivor. Junko subsequently uses Izuru's involvement in a recording which she sends along with a mass e-mail to the students of the Reserve Course exposing his existence along with the footage of her killing game and how their funding had been used for human experimentation which led to Izuru's creation, leading to a mass riot and protest dubbed "The Parade".

After deciding to use her own class for her next killing game, Junko and Mukuro create a new brainwashing video they dub the "Despair Video" with the intent of sharing it with the entirety of the Reserve Course and pull in further support for "Ultimate Despair", drawing in Nagito Komaeda and a class representative who would later serve as the basis for Chiaki Nanami, investigating the cause of the first killing game, now dubbed "The Tragedy". However, after their homeroom teacher Chisa Yukizome comes across the group, creating a diversion by throwing a fire extinguisher, the pair escape, leaving Chisa to be brainwashed and lobotomized by Junko and Mukuro, after firstly demonstrating the loyalty of their followers by having a Reserve Course student commit suicide at their command.

Later, Junko addresses the representative "Chiaki" via a monitor and traps her inside a test course for her "punishment" center, intended to induce the rest of Nagito's class to her cause via brainwashing. Overlooking the city before the school from its roof, Junko, Mukuro and Izuru stand triumphant as they plan to "infect" the world with despair, before sending a mass text to the Reserve Course students, ordering them to commit mass suicide, to which Mukuro stares at Junko in admiration, loyalty, and joy; glad to die for her cause if Junko would ever feel the need to kill them. Sending Izuru to lead her class in bringing despair to the world, Junko prepares for the coming apocalypse.

Several months later, shortly before the events of Danganronpa: Trigger Happy Havoc, Junko and Mukuro assist their class in converting the academy into a bunker to protect them from the chaos outside, while secretly preparing to have them detained to begin their killing game. After Makoto unknowingly displays his "ultimate luck", which Junko finds is hard to predict, she rejects Mukuro's suggestion that they kill him, knowing that it would expose them and seeing it as a challenge for her if someone as "ordinary" like Makoto could ever potentially defeat her, unkowingly setting up her own end.

In the "Future and Hope Arc" of Danganronpa 3: The End of Hope's Peak High School, set after the events of the second game, Junko makes a cameo appearance in the title sequence and in a flashback to her using blackmail to arrange to have her role in the fall of Hope's Peak Academy hidden from public knowledge. Later, Junko appears in the afterlife, talking with the spirit of Chisa while watching the events of her successor's "final killing game."

Other appearances
Junko Enoshima appears in the Japanese manga adaptation of the series, written and illustrated by Touya Hajime and published by Enterbrain, as well as the spin-off Killer Killer. The series was published in the United States by Enterbrain USA. An additional manga series, published by Ichijinsha, was released solely in Japan. Junko is also the main protagonist of the light novel series Danganronpa/Zero, and a supporting character in Danganronpa Kirigiri. A Japanese musical and series of stage plays based on the series, sponsored by Kellogg's Cornflakes, cast actor Sayaka Kanda as Junko Enoshima, in addition to confirming her incestuous relationship with her sister Mukuro Ikusaba (whom Kanda also portrays) formerly only inferred in previous media, adapting the events of the first two games and the anime series and featuring Nobuyo Ōyama and TARAKO reprising their roles as Monokuma from the video game series.

Junko is depicted in the 2019 Spike Chunsoft game AI: The Somnium Files, in which protagonists Date and his A.I. Aiba discover an autograph left by Junko in the titular somnium, featuring a drawing of herself with two Monokuma robots. The game is additionally implied to be set in the same fictional universe as Danganronpa in the resulting conversation between the duo.

Junko is included as a playable character in a 2020 crossover event of the NetEase horror game, Identity V, alongside her Monokuma form and fellow Danganronpa characters Makoto Naegi and Kyoko Kirigiri, where she (in either form) pursues the latter pair with a hammer, with the intent of executing them.

Reception
Junko Enoshima has generally been praised by critics for being depicted as a thoroughly irredeemable character with a realistic profession, praised as "a powerful and dynamic figure [whose] legacy lives on in [all] subsequent games." In 2019, Polygon ranked her as one of the best video game characters of the 2010s decade while Comic Book Resources ranked her as the villain with the 3rd highest body count in manga and anime in 2020. In 2013 poll from Anime Trend, Junko was voted as the ninth best female character from the year based on her appearances in Danganronpa: The Animation. In a Danganronpa: The Animation poll, Junko took the ninth place. Comic Book Resources listed her as the third most intelligent character from the franchise, citing how she manipulates most of the game's characters to entertain herself even if costs her own sister's life. Kotaku praised her characterization in the Danganronpa Zero light novel for providing more depth to her characterization in contrast to her lack of screentime in the first game as a result of appearing in the final act. In a 2021 poll, Junko was voted as the tenth best Danganronpa character.

Since the release of Danganronpa: Trigger Happy Havoc in November 2010, Junko has become one of its most popular characters, with several memes (such as “Junko posing”) being made about her. Junko and Monokuma were collectively named as the "Most Popular Game Character for Cosplay" in the Guinness World Records Gamer's Edition in 2018.

Junko returns in the Despair Arc from the anime. Beckett enjoyed her return as an antagonist based on her traits. Thanasis Karavasilis from Manga Tokyo was also pleased with Junko's return but felt the other characters from the Despair Arc managed to be as entertaining as her.  Kotaku claimed that Hajime's transformation into Izuru and his team up with Junko served as one of the biggest attractions from the anime's Despair Arc. Manga.Tokyo also compared Nagito with Izuru, due to both of them sharing characterization similarities, mainly their talents, and wondered whether the two would fight. Destructoid called Junko the best character in the entire franchise for how she embodies the themes often discussed in the series by the cast and how due to popular demand, her legacy continues in following installments despite her death.

References

Danganronpa characters
Anime and manga supervillains
Artificial intelligence characters in video games
Female characters in anime and manga
Female characters in video games
Female video game villains
Fictional characters involved in incest
Fictional characters with alter egos
Fictional characters with amnesia
Fictional executed characters
Fictional executioners
Fictional mass murderers
Fictional Japanese people in video games
Fictional private investigators
Fictional soldiers in video games
Fictional sororicides
Fictional suicides
Fictional characters with immortality
Fictional terrorists
Fictional torturers
Video game characters introduced in 2010